Telyashevo (Teläş) is a rural locality (a village) and the administrative centre of Rostovsky Selsoviet, Mechetlinsky District, Bashkortostan, Russia. The population was 479 as of 2010. There are 3 streets.

Geography 
Telyashevo is located 29 km northeast of Bolsheustyikinskoye (the district's administrative centre) by road. Takino is the nearest rural locality.

References 

Rural localities in Mechetlinsky District